Marco Lund (born 30 June 1996) is a Danish footballer who plays for IFK Norrköping.

References

1996 births
Living people
Danish men's footballers
Denmark under-21 international footballers
Denmark youth international footballers
Danish Superliga players
Allsvenskan players
Esbjerg fB players
Odense Boldklub players
IFK Norrköping players
Danish expatriate men's footballers
Expatriate footballers in Sweden
Association football defenders